Artusi is the name of two Italians:

 Giovanni Artusi (1540–1613), composer, music theorist and famous reactionary music critic
 Pellegrino Artusi (1820–1922), author